Tell es-Sawwan is an important Samarran period archaeological site in Saladin Province, Iraq.

The site is a primarily Ubaid, Hassuna, and Samarra culture occupation with some later Babylonian graves. It is considered the type site for the Samarran culture.

Tell es-Sawwan and its environment
The main mound was surrounded by a three-metre defensive ditch and a strong mudbrick wall. The village consisted of large houses and other buildings thought to be granaries.

The inhabitants of Tell es-Sawwan were farmers who used irrigation from the Tigris to support their crops, as rainfall was unreliable. They used stone and flint tools similar to those of the Hassuna culture. Their prosperity, probably based on the dependability of irrigated crops, is evidenced by the presence of fine Samarran ware and beautiful, translucent marble vessels

Underfloor graves of adults and children contained terracotta and alabaster statuettes of women and men, in various poses; some of these had the eyes and pointed heads typical of the Ubaid period.

History of research
The site was excavated by a team from the Iraqi Directorate General of Antiquities in seven seasons between 1964 and 1971. The second season was led by Khalid Ahmad Al-a'dami and the sixth and seventh season by Walid Yasin.

Gallery

See also

 Cities of the ancient Near East

Notes

Further reading
Abdul Qadir al-Tekriti, The Flint and Obsidian Implements of Tell es-Sawwan, Sumer, vol. 24, pp. 53–36, 1968
Keith Flannery and Jane C. Wheeler, Animal Bones From Tell as-Sawwan Level III (Samaran Period), Sumer, vol. 23, pp. 179–182, 1967
Donny George Youkana, Tell Es-Sawwan: The Architecture of the Sixth Millennium BC, NABU, 1997,  
H Helbaek, Early Hassunan vegetable food at Tell es-Sawwan near Samarra, Sumer, vol. 20, 1966
C. Breniquet, Rapport sur deux campagnes de fouilles à Tell es-Sawwan, 1988–1989, Mesopotamia, vol. 27, pp. 5–30, 1992
F. Strika,  Clay human figurines with applied decoration from Tell Es-Sawwan, Mesopotamia, vol. 33, pp. 7–21, 1998
Joan Oates, The Baked Clay Figurines from Tell es-Sawwan, Iraq, vol. 28, no. 2, pp. 146–153, 1966

1964 archaeological discoveries
Sawwan
Sawwan
Sawwan
Samarra culture
Hassuna culture
Ubaid period